Eye of the Soundscape is an album by Polish progressive rock band Riverside, released on 21 October 2016 through InsideOut Music.

Background 
The album is a collection of older experimental instrumental pieces in addition to four new tracks: "Where the River Flows", "Shine" (released in Poland as the only single), "Sleepwalkers" and "Eye of the Soundscape".

It is the first, and only, posthumous album to feature guitarist Piotr Grudziński after his death on 21 February 2016.

Track listing

Personnel 
Riverside
 Mariusz Duda – loops and percussion (except "Heavenland", "Promise" and "Eye of the Soundscape"); bass (CD1: 1-3; CD2: 1, 2, 4); acoustic guitar (CD1: 1, 2 and 4; CD2: 1, 3, 4, 7); vocals (CD1: 1, 3 and 5; CD2: 1, 2); keyboards on "Nigh Session - Part One", "Sleepwalkers" and "Machines"; ukulele on "Night Session - Part Two", "Rainbow Trip" and "Promise"; fretless bass on "Aether"
 Michał Łapaj – keyboards (except "Heavenland" and "Promise"); synthesizers (except "Nigh Session - Part Two, "Heavenland" and "Promise"); electric piano on "Night Sessions"; piano on "Heavenland"; organ on "Eye of the Soundscape"
Piotr Grudziński – electric guitar (except "Shine", "Heavenland" and "Machines")
 Piotr Kozieradzki – drums on "Rapid Eye Movement"

Guest personnel
 Marcin Odyniec – saxophone on "Night Session - Part Two"

Production
 Mariusz Duda – production
 Magda & Robert Srzednicki – production, recording, mixing, mastering

Charts

References

2016 albums
Inside Out Music albums
Riverside (band) albums